Rabea Jumaa (born 10 April 1992) is a Syrian footballer who plays for Etehad Al Zarqah in the Jordan League Division 1.

Club career
Rabea began his professional career with Tishreen SC in 2007.

In September 2013, he moved to Al-Mudhaibi Club of Oman. In January 2014, he moved to Al-Musannah SC of Oman.

International career
Between 2007 and 2010, he made appearances for the Syria national under-17 football team and the Syria national under-20 football team. In 2010, an injury forced him out of the squad for the 2010 AFC U-19 Championship.

References

External links
RABEA JUMAA  PLAYER PROFILE
Player Info at Goalzz.com

1992 births
Living people
Syrian footballers
Syrian expatriate footballers
Association football forwards
Al-Musannah SC players
Expatriate footballers in Jordan
Syrian expatriate sportspeople in Jordan
Expatriate footballers in Oman
Syrian expatriate sportspeople in Oman
Syrian Premier League players